Arvid August Afzelius (8 October 1785, in Fjällåkra2 September 1871, in Enköping) was a Swedish pastor, poet, historian and mythologist.

Historical background

From 1828 till his death he was parish priest of Enköping. He is mainly known as a collaborator with the learned historian, Erik Gustaf Geijer, in the great collection of Swedish folk-songs, Svenska folk-visor från forntiden, 3 vols (Stockholm, 1814–1817).

He also published translations of the Poetic Edda and Hervarar saga, and a history of Sweden to Charles XII (of which a German translation was published in 1842), as well as original poems.

References

External links

1785 births
1871 deaths
People from Falköping Municipality
Writers from Västergötland
Swedish male poets
Swedish male writers
Swedish folk-song collectors
Swedish musicologists
19th-century Swedish poets
19th-century male writers
19th-century Swedish musicians
Translators of the Poetic Edda
19th-century translators